Damxung railway station is a railway station on the Qinghai–Tibet railway line in Damxung County, Lhasa, Tibet.

Schedules
Two passenger trains in each direction stop at the station every day.

See also 
 Damxung
 List of stations on Qingzang railway

References 

Stations on the Qinghai–Tibet Railway
Railway stations in Tibet
Damxung County